John Charles Smith (born 27 November 1989), known professionally as JohnBoy Smith, is a British parathlete and wheelchair racer and is from the Romany community who competes in the T54 category sprint events.

Early life 
Smith was born in Gravesend, Kent, England. At age 16, he was mistaken for a poacher and shot in the back leading to a spinal cord injury that left him with complete T10/T11 paraplegia. He got motivated to pursue para-athletics and wheelchair racing after watching 2012 London Paralympics.

Career

He won a silver medal in the T54 marathon of 2018 Gold Coast Commonwealth Games held in Australia representing England. He competed in 2020 Summer Paralympics in Tokyo, Japan representing Great Britain in T54 marathon. In 2022 Smith won a gold medal for England at the 2022 Commonwealth Games in the marathon (T54) event.

See also 
 Kurt Fearnley
 Toby Gold

References

External links 
 
 
 
 
 

1989 births
Living people
British people of Romani descent
Romani sportspeople
English male wheelchair racers
Commonwealth Games medallists in athletics
British male wheelchair racers
Athletes (track and field) at the 2018 Commonwealth Games
Athletes (track and field) at the 2022 Commonwealth Games
Commonwealth Games gold medallists for England
Commonwealth Games silver medallists for England
Medallists at the 2018 Commonwealth Games